An Engineer's Sweetheart a.k.a. '(The) Engineer's Sweetheart' is a lost 1910 silent film short directed by Fred J. Balshofer and starring Alice Joyce. It was produced and released by the Kalem Company and Bison Film Company.

Cast
Alice Joyce

References

External links
 An Engineer's Sweetheart at IMDb.com

1910 films
Lost American films
American black-and-white films
Kalem Company films
American silent short films
1910 lost films
Films directed by Fred J. Balshofer
1910s American films